Peashooter or pea shooter may refer to:

 Peashooter (toy), consisting of a tube through which peas or other small objects are blown
 Boeing P-26 Peashooter, an American fighter aircraft
 Peashooter, a plant from the franchise Plants vs. Zombies

See also
 Pea (disambiguation)
 Shooter (disambiguation)